The Daily Home is a daily newspaper serving the Talladega County and St. Clair County, Alabama areas. Originally begun as a weekly in 1867 it was called Our Mountain Home until daily production began in 1909 at which point the name was changed to The Talladega Daily Home. In 1965 the paper was purchased by Consolidated Publishing a local company which also publishes the Anniston Star and several local weeklies. The name was changed to The Daily Home when an office was opened in Sylacauga and coverage expanded to include all of Talladega County. In 1980 an office was opened in Pell City and the coverage expanded to its current circulation area.

The Daily Home is the oldest continuously circulating newspaper in the two counties and one of the oldest in the state. It is the leading paper for the two county area. Every year the Daily Home is a major sponsor of the local Pell City Block Party.

References

External links
The Daily Home official website

Newspapers published in Alabama
Newspapers established in 1867
Talladega County, Alabama
St. Clair County, Alabama
Daily newspapers published in the United States
1867 establishments in Alabama